Julia Phillips (née Miller; April 7, 1944 – January 1, 2002) was an American film producer and author. She co-produced with her husband Michael (and others) three prominent films of the 1970s—The Sting, Taxi Driver, and Close Encounters of the Third Kind—and was the first female producer to win an Academy Award for Best Picture, received for The Sting.

In 1991, Phillips published an infamous tell-all memoir of her years as a Hollywood producer, titled You'll Never Eat Lunch in This Town Again, which became a bestseller.

Early life
She was born Julia Miller to a Polish-Jewish family in New York City, the daughter of Tanya and Adolph Miller. Her father was a chemical engineer who worked on the Manhattan Project; her mother was a writer who became addicted to prescription drugs. She grew up in Brooklyn; Great Neck, New York; and Milwaukee. In 1965, she received a bachelor's degree in political science from Mount Holyoke College, and in 1966, she married Michael Phillips. After school, she worked as book section editor at the Ladies' Home Journal and then as a story editor for Paramount Pictures. In 1971, she and her husband, who had been a securities analyst for two years, moved to California to produce Steelyard Blues with Jane Fonda and Donald Sutherland, released in 1973.

Film career
In 1972, Phillips along with her husband Michael Phillips and producer Tony Bill commissioned David S. Ward to write the screenplay for The Sting, for $3,500. In 1973, The Sting won the Academy Award for Best Picture and made Phillips the first woman to win an Oscar as a producer (an award shared by Tony Bill and Michael Phillips). In 1977, Taxi Driver, produced by the Phillipses, was nominated for Best Picture. Close Encounters of the Third Kind, her third major film, was produced with Michael Phillips. François Truffaut, one of the film's stars, publicly criticized Phillips as incompetent, a charge she rejected, writing that she essentially nursed Truffaut through his self-created nightmare of implied hearing loss, sickness and chaos during the production. Phillips was also a notorious drug user (cocaine especially), which she chronicled in detail in her memoirs. The side-effects of cocaine addiction caused her to be fired from Close Encounters of the Third Kind during post-production. Periods of drug abuse, gratuitous spending and damaging boyfriends took their toll over the next few years.

Phillips's early work in a producing team with her husband continues to receive acclaim within the industry. Twenty-five years after its Oscar success, The Sting was inducted into the Producers Guild of America's Hall of Fame, granting each of its producers a Golden Laurel Award. In June 2007, Taxi Driver was ranked as the 52nd-best American feature film of all time by the American Film Institute. In December 2007, Close Encounters was deemed "culturally, historically, or aesthetically significant" by the United States Library of Congress and selected for preservation in the National Film Registry.

Publishing success
In 1991, Phillips published You'll Never Eat Lunch in This Town Again about her experiences in Hollywood. The book topped the New York Times bestseller list, but its revelations about high-profile film personalities, Hollywood's drug culture, and casting couch sensibilities drew ire from many former colleagues. Her follow-up book Driving Under the Affluence was released in 1995. It was mostly an account of how the success of her first book changed her life. In 2000, she also helped Matt Drudge write his Drudge Manifesto.

Death
Phillips died from cancer at her home in West Hollywood, California, on New Year's Day 2002, at the age of 57, and was interred in the Hillside Memorial Park Cemetery in Culver City, California. She had one daughter, Kate Phillips-Wiczyk, who is married to Modi Wiczyk, co-founder of independent film and television studio Media Rights Capital.

Filmography
She was a producer in all films unless otherwise noted.

Film

As an actress

See also

List of Academy Award records

References

External links

 

1944 births
2002 deaths
20th-century American Jews
20th-century American businesspeople
20th-century American businesswomen
20th-century American memoirists
21st-century American Jews
American people of Polish-Jewish descent
American women film producers
American women memoirists
Burials at Hillside Memorial Park Cemetery
Businesspeople from New York City
Deaths from cancer in California
Film producers from New York (state)
Jewish American writers
Jewish women writers
Mount Holyoke College alumni
People from Great Neck, New York
Producers who won the Best Picture Academy Award
Writers from Brooklyn